Payette Peak, at  above sea level is a peak in the Sawtooth Range of Idaho. The peak is located in the Sawtooth Wilderness of Sawtooth National Recreation Area on the border of Boise and Custer counties. Payette Peak rises above the southwest end of Hidden Lake.

References 

Mountains of Boise County, Idaho
Mountains of Custer County, Idaho
Mountains of Idaho
Sawtooth Wilderness